The 1943 Paris–Tours was the 37th edition of the Paris–Tours cycle race and was held on 30 May 1943. The race started in Paris and finished in Tours. The race was won by Gabriel Gaudin.

General classification

References

1943 in French sport
1943
May 1943 sports events